Zinovie Timofeevici Serdiuk (15 November 1903 – 8 August 1982) was a Ukrainian–Moldavian politician of the Soviet period.

Biography 
Zinovie Serdiuk (Зиновий Тимофеевич Сердюк) was born on November 15, 1903, in Harbuzynka, Kherson Governorate, Russian Empire. He died on August 8, 1982, in Moscow.

In 1935–1936 he was a deputy chief of political administration of the Chief Directorate of the Northern Sea Route.

Zinovie Serdiuk was the First Secretary of the Moldavian Communist Party (February 8, 1954 – May 29, 1961). During his rule the main accent was pointed on the atheism, while in the economic sector the finishing of collectivization by formation of kolkhozes and sovkhozes everywhere in the Moldavian SSR. A number of industrial units were built.

References 
 
 *** - Enciclopedia sovietică moldovenească (Chişinău, 1970–1977)

External links
  Биография
  Кто есть кто в Правительствах СССР

 
 
 

1903 births
1982 deaths
People from Mykolaiv Oblast
People from Yelisavetgradsky Uyezd
Communist Party of the Soviet Union members
Ukrainian communists
First Secretaries of the Communist Party of Moldavia
First convocation members of the Verkhovna Rada of the Ukrainian Soviet Socialist Republic
Second convocation members of the Verkhovna Rada of the Ukrainian Soviet Socialist Republic
Third convocation members of the Verkhovna Rada of the Ukrainian Soviet Socialist Republic
Burials in Troyekurovskoye Cemetery
Heroes of Socialist Labour
Recipients of the Order of Lenin